The Commonwealth Law Reports (CLR) are the authorised reports of decisions of the High Court of Australia. The Commonwealth Law Reports are published by the Lawbook Company, a division of Thomson Reuters. James Merralls AM QC was the editor of the Reports from 1969 until his death in 2016. The current editors are Christopher Horan KC and Paul Vout KC.

Each reported judgment includes a headnote written by an expert reporter (by convention, a practising barrister) which, as an authorised report, has been approved by the High Court. The current reporters are as follows:

 Roshan Chaile
 Ella Delany
 Bora Kaplan
 Rudi Kruse
 James McComish
 William Newland
 Alistair Pound SC
 Stephen Puttick
 Daniel Reynolds
 Alexander Solomon-Bridge
 Julia Wang
 Michael Wells
 Jillian Williams
 Radhika Withana

The headnotes include a summary of counsel's legal arguments. The Reports also include tables of cases reported, affirmed, reversed, overruled, applied or judicially commented on and cited.

The Reports are available in PDF format from Westlaw AU. Scans of the first 100 volumes of the Reports, covering cases from 1903 to 1959, were freely published on the High Court's website and on BarNet JADE as part of the One-100 project.

Editors and reporters 
The editors of the Commonwealth Law Reports from time to time have been as follows:

The reporters of the Commonwealth Law Reports from time to time have been as follows:

Citation

For lawyers, the Commonwealth Law Reports are the preferred source for decisions of the High Court of Australia.  An example of proper citation is:

Coleman v Power (2004) 220 CLR 1

This citation indicates that the decision of the Court in the case entitled Coleman v Power, decided in 2004, can be found beginning at page 1 of volume 220 of the Commonwealth Law Reports.

An alternative citation, which is medium neutral, is:

Coleman v Power [2004] HCA 39

This citation refers to the case entitled Coleman v Power, which was the 39th decision published by the High Court of Australia in 2004.

Both forms of citation (parallel citations) may be used so that users can access the case from different sources:
Coleman v Power [2004] HCA 39; (2004) 220 CLR 1

See also
 Law report
 List of Law Reports in Australia
 The Law Reports
 United States Reports
 Supreme Court Reports (Canada)

References

High Court of Australia
Case law reporters of Australia